On 6 May 2021, an assassination attempt was made against Maldivian speaker of the People's Majlis and former president Mohamed Nasheed near his home in Malé. At 20:39 MVT (UTC+5), a homemade explosive device planted on a parked motorcycle exploded, injuring Nasheed and four others.  Maldives authorities alleges it to be a terrorist attack by religious 'extremists'. Three suspects have been arrested. The arrested suspects denied being involved; all three of them had prior criminal records.

Current Maldivian president Ibrahim Mohamed Solih described the explosion as "an attack on Maldives' democracy and economy". He has promised a "swift and thorough" investigation, warning that the perpetrators will "face the full force of the law".

Event 
The explosion occurred on 6 May, 2021, while Nasheed was getting into his car. He sustained injuries and underwent surgery in ADK hospital. Two of Nasheed's bodyguards and two bystanders, one of whom was a British national, were also injured. No one has claimed responsibility for the attack.

Investigations 
Police Commissioner Mohamed Hameed said 450 officers had been deployed to investigate. Two experts from the Australian Federal Police were to be involved in the inquiry. This was the second time Australian authorities have helped the Maldives with an alleged assassination attempt, after a 2015 investigation into an explosion on then-President Abdulla Yameen's speedboat, while officials from the United Nations Office on Drugs and Crime and the United States Department of State had also offered support.  Officials close to Nasheed’s Maldivian Democratic Party (MDP) told Agence France-Presse (AFP) they believed he may have been targeted in retaliation for his anti-corruption campaign.

On 9 May 2021, the Maldivian police announced that they had arrested the "prime suspect" (identified from video footage) and two accomplices, and were still searching for others.  The police attributed the attack to "religious extremists".  The arrested suspects denied being involved; all three of them had prior criminal records.  On the same day, the Parliamentary Committee on National Security Services began an inquiry into how Nasheed's security was breached.  On 10 May, President Solih announced that a special team had been formed in the Prosecutor General's Office to handle the court case.

Casualties 
Nasheed underwent 16 hours of surgery for injuries to his head, chest, abdomen, and limbs.  Multiple pieces of shrapnel were removed during surgery, including one lodged a centimetre away from his heart.  Agence France-Presse also reported that the bomb was filled with ball bearings to increase the damage caused. By 8 May, Nasheed's condition had improved so that he could be taken off life support, although he remained in intensive care. His condition remained stable, and he recovered after undergoing multiple emergency surgeries. The hospital treating the former president said he was in a critical condition in intensive care on 7th May after surgery to his head, chest, abdomen and limbs.

On 13 May 2021, Nasheed was flown to Germany for further medical treatment after being seriously injured along with three other people. He returned to the country on 11 October 2021, and resumed his duties as speaker.

References 

2021 in the Maldives
21st century in Malé
Failed assassination attempts in Asia
Improvised explosive device bombings in 2021
Improvised explosive device bombings in Asia
May 2021 crimes in Asia
Motorcycle bombings
Terrorist incidents in Asia in 2021
Terrorist incidents in the Maldives